is a Japanese actor, voice actor and narrator. Some of his best known roles include Soun Tendo in Ranma ½ and Captain Kiichi Goto in Patlabor. He is employed by the talent management firm 81 Produce.

Filmography

Television animation
The Super Dimension Fortress Macross (1982) (Exsedol Folmo)
Mobile Suit Zeta Gundam (1985) (Ben Wooder)
Mobile Suit Gundam ZZ (1986) (Rakan Dahkaran)
Patlabor (1989) (Captain Kiichi Gotō)
Ranma ½ (1989) (Sōun Tendō)
DNA² (1994) (Yokomori)
Macross 7 (1994) (Exsedol Folmo)
Magical Girl Pretty Sammy (1996) (Principal Miura)
Rurouni Kenshin (1996) (Raijuta Isurugi)
Fancy Lala (1998) (Mystery Man)
Serial Experiments Lain (1998) (Yasuo Iwakura)
Dual! Parallel Trouble Adventure (1999) (Ken Sanada)
To Heart (1999) (Gengoro Nagase)
Inuyasha (2001) (Daija (The False Water God))
Monster (2005) (Fritz Vardemann)
Hell Girl (2006) (Ryōsuke Sekine)
D.Gray-man (2008) (Malcolm C. Lvellie)
Hyouge Mono (2011) (Yamanoue Sōji)
WataMote (2013) (Narrator)
Buddy Complex (2014) (Alessandro Fermi)
Heavy Object (2015) (Flide)
Boruto: Naruto Next Generations (2020) (Kaneki)

Original video animation (OVA)
Legend of the Galactic Heroes (1989) (Uranff)
Legend of the Galactic Heroes (1991) (Nilsson)
Magical Girl Pretty Sammy (1995) (Bif Standard)
Jungle de Ikou! (1997) (Fuyuhiko)

Theatrical animation
Techno Police 21C (1982) (Blader)
Macross: Do You Remember Love? (1984) (Exsedol 4970)
Patlabor: The Movie (1989) (Captain Kiichi Goto)
Patlabor 2: The Movie (1993) (Captain Kiichi Goto)
WXIII: Patlabor the Movie 3 (2002) (Captain Kiichi Goto)
Atagoal (2006) (Kara'agemaru)

Video games
Inuyasha (2001) (Daija)
Final Fantasy XII (2006) (Judge Ghis)
Macross Triangle Frontier (2011) (Exsedol Folmo)
Shin Megami Tensei: Devil Summoner: Soul Hackers (2012) (Takeo Kitagawa)

Drama CD
Soul Eater (2005) (Shinigami)

Dubbing

Live-action
The Amityville Horror (Chief of Police (Rich Komenich))
Behind Enemy Lines II: Axis of Evil (Admiral Henry D (Glenn Morshower))
Black Book (General Käutner (Christian Berkel))
The Dark Knight (Gerard Stephens (Keith Szarabajka))
D-Tox (2006 TV Tokyo edition) (Jack Bennett (Stephen Lang))
From the Earth to the Moon (Alan Shepard (Ted Levine))
Happiest Season (Ted (Victor Garber))
Never Talk to Strangers (Cliff Raddison (Dennis Miller))
Restoration (King Charles II (Sam Neill))
Those Magnificent Men in their Flying Machines (1975 NTV edition) (Richard Mays (James Fox))
The Unborn (Gordon Beldon (James Remar))

Animation
The Animatrix (Client)
Romance of the Three Kingdoms (Xun You, Zhang Zhao, Han Sui, and Huang Zhong)

References

External links
 Official agency profile 
 
 
 

1946 births
Living people
Japanese male stage actors
Japanese male video game actors
Japanese male voice actors
Male voice actors from Fukuoka Prefecture
81 Produce voice actors